Boquhan (pronounced Bowhan) is a hamlet in Stirling, Scotland, sometimes known as Wester Boquhan to distinguish it from the other nearby Boquhan, near Kippen.

Just east of Boquhan is Boquhan Old House which dates from 1784.

Boquhan is in the catchment area for Balfron Primary School and Balfron High School.

References

External links

Scottish Places - Boquhan
Canmore - Boquhan Old House

Hamlets in Stirling (council area)